Bat Sheva Yonis-Guttman (January 1, 1880, Russia - July 9, 1947, Tel Aviv), was an Israeli physician. She was one of the first doctors, and the first female doctor in Iseral, and the first doctor in Gedera and Tel Aviv

Bat Sheva Yonis-Guttman was a pioneer in the field of infant care and medicine in the Land of Israel. She was one of the founders of the Hebrew Medical Association, later the Israel Medical Association. She established the first milk drop station in Tel Aviv.

See also
 Sonia Belkind

References

1880 births
1947 deaths
Israeli physicians
Emigrants from the Russian Empire to the Ottoman Empire